Karjiang is a mountain in Tibet Autonomous Region, located near the Bhutan–Tibet border. Other peaks include Karjiang North (7196 m), Karjiang II/Central (7045 m), Karjiang III or Taptol Kangri (6820 m) and the top of the north-eastern shoulder (6400 m).

Attempts 

In 1986, a Japanese expedition led by N. Shigo climbed Karjiang II (Central).

Karjiang I remains unclimbed. A Dutch expedition attempted to climb Karjiang during September–October 2001 without success. The group consisted of Haroen Schijf, Rudolf van Aken, Pepijn Bink, Court Haegens, Willem Horstmann and Rein-Jan Koolwijk. The group climbed Karjiang III. According to Schijf, Karjiang I looked very steep and difficult to climb, and the bad weather made an attempt too dangerous.

In 2010, Joe Puryear and David Gottlieb gained the Shipton-Tilman Award to attempt climbing Karjiang. However, they did not receive the necessary permit, and made an attempt to climb  Labuche Kang  to the west, during which Puryear died.

Video 
Karjiang Virtual Aerial Video

References

Mountains of Tibet
Seven-thousanders of the Himalayas